Atherigona oryzae, the rice shoot fly, is a species of fly in the family Muscidae. It is found in Asia and Australia. It is known to affect rice, kodo millet, wheat, and corn crops.

References

Muscidae
Insect pests of millets
Taxa named by John Russell Malloch